The Kulmiye Peace, Unity and Development Party, also known as simply Kulmiye, is a political party in Somaliland. The party was founded by Ahmed Mohamed Mohamoud "Silanyo" in May 2002, ahead of the first municipal elections later that year. The party is mainly supported by people from the Habr Je'lo, Habr Awal and Darod clans.

In the presidential elections of 14 April 2003, its candidate Ahmed Mohamed Mohamoud "Silanyo" won 42.1% of the popular vote. He was narrowly defeated by Dahir Riyale Kahin.

In parliamentary elections held on 29 September 2005, the party won 34.1% of the vote and 28 out of 82 seats.

In the 2010 presidential election, Silanyo and his running mate Abdirahman Saylici claimed victory and comfortably defeated Kahin.

In the 2017 presidential election, President Silanyo chose not to seek a second term in office. Muse Bihi Abdi, who became party Chairman in 2015 and his running mate, incumbent Vice President Abdirahman Saylici won with 55% of the vote.

History of leaders

2017 Somaliland presidential election

Presidential elections were held in Somaliland on 13 November 2017, the third direct presidential election since 2003. General elections had been scheduled to be held in Somaliland on 27 March 2017 to elect both the President and House of Representatives, but were initially postponed by six months due to the drought condition in the region. The elections to elect the President and Vice President were eventually held separately on 13 November. Incumbent President Ahmed Mohamed Mohamoud of the Kulmiye did not run for a second term.

The result was a victory for the ruling Kulmiye party and its candidate Muse Bihi Abdi, who received 55% of the vote.

Electoral history

Presidential elections

Parliamentary elections

Local elections

See also
United Peoples' Democratic Party
For Justice and Development
Waddani

References

External links

 Kulmiye Party Of Somaliland

Political parties in Somaliland
Liberal parties in Africa
Politics of Somaliland